The Silver King is an 1882 melodramatic play, by Henry Arthur Jones and Henry Herman.  It was "so well known that criticism is superfluous" and played to record-breaking audiences.  It was adapted for films in 1919 and 1929. The play featured stars such as Mary Pickford, with Phoebe Carlo playing Ned in the original production.

References

External links
 The Silver King (Internet Archive)

Plays by Henry Arthur Jones
1882 plays